Hati may refer to:
Hati Hróðvitnisson, a wolf in Norse mythology
Hati (moon), one of Saturn's moons
Hati, Iran, a village in Khuzestan Province, Iran
Hati District, an administrative subdivision of Khuzestan Province, Iran
Hati Rural District, an administrative subdivision of Khuzestan India

See also
Haiti, a country with a similar spelling
Hatis, a village in Armenia
Hatti (disambiguation)